Donald Earl Hill (born November 12, 1960) is a former professional baseball player who played nine seasons for the Oakland Athletics, Chicago White Sox, California Angels, and Minnesota Twins of Major League Baseball.

Donnie moved from Pomona to Huntington Beach when he was 13 years old. He then went on to play baseball at Edison High School for Ron LaRuffa and was on the state champion Orange Coast College team for Mike Mayne. He then moved on to Division 1 where he was a member of the 1981 College World Series-winning Arizona State team under Jim Brock. 

Donnie is currently a golf instructor at Strawberry Farms Golf Course in Orange County, California.

References

1960 births
Living people
Major League Baseball infielders
Baseball players from California
Orange Coast Pirates baseball players
Oakland Athletics players
Chicago White Sox players
California Angels players
Minnesota Twins players
Hawaii Islanders players
Modesto A's players
Tacoma Tigers players
Vancouver Canadians players
West Haven A's players
Anchorage Glacier Pilots players
Sportspeople from Huntington Beach, California
Sportspeople from Pomona, California
Arizona State Sun Devils baseball players